|wcoach= Hans-Peter Smit
|wsemis= 
|wnetwork= ABS-CBN Sports+Action

|junior=Juniors Finals
|jhigherseed=
|jhigherseed_game1=1
|jhigherseed_series= 1
|jlowerseed= 
|jlowerseed_game1= 0
|jlowerseed_series= 0
|jduration= 
|jarena= Rizal Memorial Stadium
|jMVP= Orlan Togores
|jcoach= 

|prevlink=UAAP Season 78 football tournaments
|prev=78
|seasonlink=UAAP Season 79
|year=2016–17
|nextlink=UAAP Season 80 football tournaments
|next=80
}}

The UAAP Season 79 seniors division football tournament started on February 4, 2017, following the shift in the start of the league at the Rizal Memorial Stadium in Manila. Other games were held at the Moro Lorenzo Football Field of Ateneo de Manila University in Katipunan Ave., Loyola Heights, Quezon City.

Venues

Men's tournament

Elimination round

Team standing

Match-up results

Scores

First round

Second round

Playoffs 

Bold = winner
* = after extra time, = penalty shootout score

Semifinals

Finals

Awards

Most Valuable Player: Jarvey Gayoso (Ateneo de Manila University)
Rookie of the Year: Jordan Jarvis (Ateneo de Manila University)
Best Striker: Jarvey Gayoso (Ateneo De Manila University)
Best Midfielder: Paolo Bugas (Far Eastern University)
Best Defender: Jeremiah Rocha (Ateneo de Manila University)
Best Goalkeeper: AJ Arcilla (Ateneo de Manila University)

Mythical Eleven
Goalkeeper: AJ Arcilla (Ateneo de Manila University)
Defenders: Jeremiah Rocha (Ateneo de Manila University), Noel Brago (De La Salle University), Jordan Jarvis (Ateneo de Manila University), Darryl Regala (University of Santo Tomas)
Midfielders: Paolo Bugas (Far Eastern University), Enzo Ceniza (Ateneo De Manila University), Julian Roxas (Ateneo De Manila University), Jed Diamante (De La Salle University)
Strikers: Jarvey Gayoso (Ateneo de Manila University), Rico Andes (Far Eastern University)

Women's tournament

Elimination round

Team standing

First round

Second round

Playoffs

Finals

Awards

Most Valuable Player: Kyla Inquig (De La Salle University)
Rookie of the Year: Mary Indac (University of Santo Tomas)
Best Striker: Kyra Dimaandal (De La Salle University)
Best Midfielder: Sara Castañeda (De La Salle University)
Best Defender: Regine Metillo (De La Salle University)
Best Goalkeeper: Inna Palacios (De La Salle University)

Mythical Eleven
Goalkeeper: Inna Palacios (De La Salle University)
Defenders: Regine Metillo (De La Salle University), Isay Sabio (Ateneo de Manila University), Ira Ilan (University of Santo Tomas), Mariel Tejada (De La Salle University)
Midfielders: Sara Castañeda (De La Salle University), Hazel Lustan (University of Santo Tomas), Irish Navaja (De La Salle University), Cam Rodriguez (Ateneo De Manila University)
Strikers: Kyra Dimaandal (De La Salle University), Charisa Lemoran (University of Santo Tomas)

Juniors' tournament

Elimination round

Team standing

Match-up results

Scores
Results to the right and top of the gray cells are first round games, those to the left and below are second round games.

Final

Awards

Most Valuable Player: Orlan Togores (Far Eastern University-Diliman)
Rookie of the Year: Jermi Darapan (Far Eastern University-Diliman)
Best Striker: Keith Absalon (Far Eastern University-Diliman)
Best Midfielder: Chester Gio Pabualan (Far Eastern University-Diliman)
Best Defender: Keith Absalon (Far Eastern University-Diliman)
Best Goalkeeper: Gavin Rosario (Ateneo de Manila University)
Fair Play Award: De La Salle-Zobel

Overall championship points

Seniors' division

Juniors' division

See also
 UAAP Season 79

79
2017 in Philippine football